Barton Heyman (born January 24, 1937 in Washington, D.C. - died May 16, 1996 in Manhattan, New York City, New York) was an American actor. Heyman was a graduate of the University of California, Los Angeles where he studied theater arts. 
As an actor in films, his obituary in the Los Angeles Times asserts that he came to public attention for his role in the 1995 movie Dead Man Walking.  Heyman was also a stage actor, appearing in a number of New York Shakespeare Festival productions.

Filmography

References

External links
 
1937 births
1996 deaths
American actors
People from Washington, D.C.